Song Shin-young (born March 1, 1977) is a South Korean professional baseball pitcher for the Hanwha Eagles of the KBO League.

References

External links
Career statistics and player information from Korea Baseball Organization

Song Shin-young at Hanwha Eagles Baseball Club 

Hanwha Eagles players
KBO League pitchers
South Korean baseball players
NC Dinos players
LG Twins players
Kiwoom Heroes players
Hyundai Unicorns players
Korea University alumni
Baseball players from Seoul
1977 births
Living people
Eunjin Song clan
South Korean Buddhists